The Lake Erie, Franklin, and Clarion Railroad  was a fifteen mile long short line that ran from a Conrail connection at Summerville, Pennsylvania, to Clarion, Pennsylvania, the county seat of Clarion County, and included a short branch from Sutton to Heidrick. The road was incorporated in 1913 as a consolidation of several other railroads, the Pennsylvania Northern, Pennsylvania Southern, and the Pittsburgh, Clarion and Franklin, which itself was formed from the Pittsburgh, Summerville, and Clarion [which began operation in 1904 and was leased to the Pennsylvania Southern in 1910. Length peaked at about 80 miles of track in around 1924. The corporate name was somewhat optimistic: the railroad never reached either Franklin or Lake Erie. 

The line's yard and engine facility were located in Clarion, just south of U.S. route 322 and behind many of the buildings of Clarion University of Pennsylvania, formerly Clarion State Teachers' College. A section house was located at the siding to Hanley Brick, now Glen-Gary in Summerville. Motive power in the line's final years was four EMD MP15DC switchers #25-28, which replaced two earlier EMD SW1500s #23-24. During the final years when steam locomotives powered LEF&C trains, most of the road's locomotives were 2-8-0's which had been acquired second hand from other railroads.
In the late 20th century, traffic included sand for Clarion's glass making plant, glass bottles, lumber, and outbound shipments of coal, some of it in unit trains from the extensive coal deposits around Clarion. Traffic also included brick from the Hanley Brick Plant in Summerville.

Abandonment
The line ceased operation in the last decade of the 1900s due to  a sharp decline in coal mining in the area. The Interstate Commerce Commission (ICC) granted LEF&C's petition for exemption to abandon its operations on September 17, 1992. Effective October 20, 1992, the ICC extended the time for the affiliated Mountain Laurel Railroad to file an offer of financial assistance, however this did not come to pass and that line was officially abandoned on November 12, 1992. The LEF&C was officially abandoned on January 5, 1993, the last day on which it compensated employees. The track was taken up and the roadbed is now a hiking path. One of the railroad's cabooses had been used for several years as a Chamber of Commerce roadside information booth across the highway from the local Wal-Mart, but has been removed and is now serving much the same purpose in the town of Foxburg on the Allegheny River, a few miles to the southwest.

See also
List of defunct Pennsylvania railroads

References
American Shortline Railroad Guide, Kalmbach Books, 1986

Defunct Pennsylvania railroads
Railway companies established in 1913
Railway companies disestablished in 1993